A by-election was held for the New South Wales Legislative Assembly seat of Waratah on 19 September 1964. It was triggered by the death of Edward Greaves.

Dates

Result

Edward Greaves died.

See also
Electoral results for the district of Waratah
List of New South Wales state by-elections

References

1964 elections in Australia
New South Wales state by-elections
1960s in New South Wales
September 1964 events in Australia